From Their Hearts is the twelfth regular studio album by European-American pop group The Kelly Family. Based on concept by Dan Kelly, it was co-produced by Kathy and Paddy Kelly and released in 1998 (see 1998 in music) throughout most of Europe. As it failed to produce any top ten single entry, the album performed noticeably worse on the charts than its predecessors, reaching top ten of the albums charts in Germany only. From Their Hearts eventually became the band's last regular studio album in their 1990s nine-person line-up, as Kathy and Johnny Kelly left the group for solo careers and did not return for the recording of their follow-up, 2002's La Patata.

Track listing

Charts

Weekly charts

Year-end charts

References

External links
 KellyFamily.de — official site

1998 albums
The Kelly Family albums